Tarkishore Prasad (born 5 February 1956) is an Indian politician belonging to the Bharatiya Janata Party who served as the 5th Deputy Chief Minister of Bihar from 16 November to 9 August 2022.He held the portfolios of Finance & Commercial Taxes along with Urban Development and Housing. He has been elected the BJP's leader in the Bihar assembly. He is currently elected as a Member of the Bihar Legislative Assembly from Katihar constituency in 2020 Bihar Legislative Assembly election.



Early life and education
Tarkishore Prasad Bhagat was born to Ganga Prasad Bhagat, representing the Kalwar caste (Bhagat) In 1956, Tarkishore completed Intermediate of Science from Darshan Sah College in Katihar under Lalit Narayan Mithila University, Darbhanga.

Political career
Prasad is a member of the Rashtriya Swayamsevak Sangh and began his political career with the Akhil Bharatiya Vidyarthi Parishad. He won his first assembly term in 2005 from Katihar seat, defeating Ram Prakash Mahato by just 165 votes. He later won the seat in 2010, 2015 and 2020 elections as well.

References

Bharatiya Janata Party politicians from Bihar
Bihar MLAs 2020–2025
Living people
Deputy Chief Ministers of Bihar
Bihar MLAs 2005–2010
1956 births